Bodeen is a surname. Notable people with the surname include:

DeWitt Bodeen (1908–1988), American screenwriter
S. A. Bodeen, American writer

See also
Boden (surname)
The BoDeans